Commandeering is an act of appropriation by the military or police whereby they take possession of the property of a member of the public.

In the United States 
In United States law, it also refers to federal government actions which would force a state government to take some action that it otherwise would not take.  The US Supreme Court has held that commandeering violates principles designed to prevent either the state or federal governments from becoming too powerful. 
Writing for the majority in 1997 for Printz v. United States, Justice Antonin Scalia said, "[t]he Federal Government may neither issue directives requiring the States to address particular problems, nor command the States' officers, or those of their political subdivisions, to administer or enforce a federal regulatory program." States derive their protection from commandeering from the Tenth Amendment.

Distinction from preemption
The Congress may enact federal law that supersedes or preempts state law. The distinction between commandeering and preemption was at issue in Murphy v. NCAA, a case involving sports betting. 

In the case of marijuana legalization, federal law preempts laws in those states that have authorized its use. The federal government has chosen not to enforce provisions of federal law that apply to otherwise law-abiding adult use in those states. If the Department of Justice were to challenge these state laws, a likely legal objection would be that this is commandeering. Challenges to state-level marijuana legalizations in federal court have been unsuccessful for this reason.

See also
Federalism in the United States

References

External links

 
 

American legal terminology